Ekins Island is an uninhabited island within the Arctic Archipelago in the territory of Nunavut. It lies in Norwegian Bay, north of Devon Island, and is also south of Cornwall Island, separated by Belcher Channel.

References

External links
 Ekins Island in the Atlas of Canada - Toporama; Natural Resources Canada

Islands of the Queen Elizabeth Islands
Uninhabited islands of Qikiqtaaluk Region